Sweethope Loughs are two freshwater lakes almost  in length, the smaller one just east of the larger, in the southern part of Northumberland, England and lying between the A68 road, and the A696 road. There is a crossing between the two lakes, which are lined with trees and surrounded by hills. To the north west are Great Wanney Crag and Little Wanney Crag.

Sweethope Loughs road bridge
At the west end of Sweethope Loughs is the first bridge, actually a culvert, on the River Wansbeck and crossed by the minor road going west from Knowesgate to the A68 road. It was constructed in 1972 and is a concrete pipe with masonry headwalls and crosses the narrow river only a few feet wide. The river continues for a mile or so further west on the moors where it rises at a height of about a thousand feet.

Fishing
Sweethope Lough is a renowned fishing location stocked with large rainbow trout, suitable for every angler, from novice to expert. Sweethope Lough boasts good access to those anglers with disabilities, and annually hosts The Viscount Devonport Sweethope Challenge for Disabled Anglers.

See also
Great Whanney
River Wansbeck

References

Lakes of Northumberland
Tourist attractions in Northumberland